Sex (alternately released as Birds & Bees) is the third album by Belgian electronic group Telex, released in 1981. The album is notable for being the first collaboration between Telex and American pop group Sparks.

Production

Marc Moulin and Dan Lacksman were introduced to Ron Mael and Russell Mael of Sparks by their mutual friend, Lio. Facing pressures to release an album in English, Moulin extended an offer to the Maels to contribute lyrics to their upcoming LP. This prompted a long-term friendship between the two bands, and led directly to Lacksman's production of the 1982 album In Outer Space.

Due to concerns about censors and the album's title, the album was released in the UK as ‘Birds & Bees.’ This release contains a different track listing and the inclusion of a few new pieces, including ‘L’ Amour Toujours,’ which would also be released on Telex's 1984 LP, Wonderful World.

Track listing

Original

See also 
 Sparks

References

1981 albums
Telex (band) albums
Disques Vogue albums